Dignitas is a Swiss nonprofit organization providing physician-assisted suicide to members with terminal illness or severe physical or mental illness, supported by independent Swiss doctors. By the end of 2020, they had assisted 3,248 people with suicide at home within Switzerland and at Dignitas' house/flat near Zürich. They provide advisory work on palliative care, health care advance directives, and suicide attempt prevention, and legislation for right-to-die laws around the world.

Members who wish to commit suicide must have sound judgement, as determined by the organization; be themselves able to bring about death; and submit a formal request including a letter explaining their wish to die and medical reports showing diagnosis and attempted treatment. For people with severe psychiatric illness, an in-depth medical report prepared by a psychiatrist is additionally required per a Swiss Supreme Court decision.

History and operation 
Dignitas was founded 17 May 1998 by Swiss lawyer Ludwig Minelli, who specialises in human rights law. Swiss laws provide that assistance to suicide is legal as long as it is not driven by selfish motives.

The person who wishes to die attends two private consultations (separated by time) with several Dignitas personnel in addition to an independent medical doctor who assesses the evidence provided by the patient in advance. Legally admissible proof that the person wishes to die is also created in the form of a signed affidavit countersigned by independent witnesses. If a patient is physically unable to sign a document, a short video of the patient is made in which they are asked to confirm their identity, that they wish to die, and that their decision is made of their own free will, without persuasion or coercion. This evidence of informed consent remains private and is preserved only for use in any possible legal dispute.

Finally, a few minutes before the lethal overdose is provided, the person is once again reminded that taking the overdose will kill them. Additionally, they are asked several times whether they want to proceed, or take some time to consider the matter further. This gives the person the opportunity to stop the process at any time. However, if at this point the person states that they are determined to proceed, a lethal overdose is provided and ingested.

Suicide method 
In general, Dignitas uses the following protocol to assist suicides: an oral dose of an antiemetic drug, followed approximately half an hour later by a lethal overdose of 15 grams of powdered pentobarbital  dissolved in a glass of water. If necessary, the drugs can be ingested through a drinking straw. The pentobarbital overdose depresses the central nervous system, causing the patient to become drowsy and fall asleep within 3–5 minutes of drinking it; anaesthesia progresses to coma, followed by respiratory arrest and death, which occurs within 30–40 minutes of ingesting the pentobarbital.

Exceptionally, in four cases in 2008, Dignitas used helium gas as a suicide method instead of a pentobarbital overdose. 
The medical supervision was still observed, however, and the method avoided controlled drugs, which reduced the risk of medical authorities disciplining the medical doctor who authorized the accompanied suicide.

Referendum 
In two referendums on 15 May 2011, voters in the Canton of Zürich overwhelmingly rejected calls to ban assisted suicide or to outlaw the practice for non-residents. Out of more than 278,000 ballots cast, the initiative to ban assisted suicide was rejected by 85 percent of voters and the initiative to outlaw it for non-residents was turned down by 78 percent.

Statistics 
Ludwig Minelli said in an interview in March 2008 that Dignitas had assisted 840 people to die, 60% of them Germans. By 2010, that number had exceeded a thousand assisted suicides.

Most people contacting Dignitas do not plan to die but wish for insurance in case their illness becomes intolerable. Of those who receive the so-called "provisional green light", 70% never return to Dignitas.

21% of people receiving assisted suicide in Dignitas do not have a terminal or progressive illness, but rather "weariness of life".

Costs and finances 
According to the official Dignitas website,  Dignitas charged its patients 7,000 Swiss Francs (approximately £5,180/US$7,980) for preparation and suicide assistance, or 10,500 Swiss Francs (approximately £7,770/US$11,970) in case of taking over family duties, including funerals, medical costs and official fees. Dignitas has been known to waive certain costs where there is hardship. Under Swiss Law, Dignitas operates as a non-profit organization, but does not open its finances to the public, which has elicited criticism from some quarters.

'Suicide tourism' 

Although it is mainly Germans who turn to Dignitas for assisted suicide, approximately 300 British citizens have travelled to Switzerland to die at one of Dignitas' rented apartments in Zürich.

Reaction of local Swiss people and authorities 
Dignitas has faced difficulties over the years. In September 2007, Dignitas was evicted, blocked or locked out of three flats, and so Minelli offered assisted suicide in his private house. This, however, was then prohibited by the local council. In October 2007, Dignitas was again prevented from working in a private house by the local council and refused rooms on an industrial site. In December 2007, an interim judgment prevented Dignitas from working in a building next to a busy brothel. The media frenzy led to several people offering Dignitas flats or houses, of which one turned out to be suitable. Since 2009, Dignitas has a house at an undisclosed location where accompanied suicide for people from abroad has taken place.

Patient selection 
In certain right-to-die organisations, an age restriction is in place for potential patients, so as to prevent young people from using their services.

Cremation urns found in Lake Zürich
In April 2010, private divers found a group of over 60 cremation urns in Lake Zürich. Each of the urns bore the logo of the Zürich Nordheim crematorium also used by Dignitas. Soraya Wernli, a former employee, had told The Times 18 months previously that Dignitas had dumped at least 300 urns in the lake. She claimed that Minelli dumped them there himself, but later asked his daughter and another member of staff to do it. In 2008, allegedly two members of Dignitas were caught trying to pour the ashes of 20 dead people into the
lake. However, it was never established whether Dignitas had anything to do with it and no charges were taken. In Switzerland, it is not against the law to scatter cremation ashes out into nature.

Dignitas in media 
In 2008, the documentary film Right to Die? was broadcast on Sky Real Lives (rebroadcast on PBS Frontline in March 2010 as The Suicide Tourist). Directed by Oscar-winning Canadian John Zaritsky, it depicts the assisted suicide of several people who have gone to Switzerland to end their lives. It includes the story of Craig Ewert, a 59-year-old retired university professor who suffered from a motor neurone disease. Ewert traveled to Switzerland where he was assisted by the Dignitas NGO. The documentary shows him passing away with Mary, his wife of 37 years, at his side. It was shown on the Swiss television network SF1 and is available as a web movie on the Dignitas website.

The BBC produced a film titled A Short Stay in Switzerland telling the story of Dr Anne Turner, who made the journey to the Dignitas assisted suicide facility. On 24 January 2006, the day before her 67th birthday, she ended her life. The film was shown on BBC1 on 25 January 2009.

Maestro Sir Edward Downes, conductor of the BBC Philharmonic and the Royal Opera, who struggled as his hearing and sight failed (but was not terminally ill), died with his wife, who had terminal cancer, at an assisted suicide facility in Switzerland in July 2009. He was 85 and she was 74.

Theorist and translator Michele Causse chose to die on her birthday, 29 July 2010, in association with Dignitas.

On 13 June 2011, BBC Two aired a documentary titled Terry Pratchett: Choosing to Die, featuring author and Alzheimer's disease sufferer Sir Terry Pratchett guiding viewers through an assisted suicide which took place at Dignitas facilities in Switzerland. Peter Smedley, a British hotelier and millionaire, and his wife Christine allowed for Pratchett to film Smedley's deliberate consumption of prepared barbiturate in a glass in order to kill himself as Christine comforted Smedley in his demise. The documentary received a highly polarized reaction in the United Kingdom, with much praise for the programme as "brave", "sensitive" and "important" whilst it also gathered accusations of "pro-death" bias from anti-euthanasia pressure groups and of encouraging the view that disability was a good reason for killing from disability groups.

Dignitas continued to be presented in the media as a political stance on the right to die. BBC featured an article regarding the death of UK citizen Jeffrey Spector, a businessman who decided to travel to Switzerland to undergo assisted suicide through Dignitas for an inoperable tumour which most likely would have caused paralysis later on in its development. This situation reignited the debate around the morality of assisted suicides in certain dilemmas, and incited current stances concerning euthanasia. Former Lord Chancellor Lord Falconer said he would "attempt to reintroduce a bill that would allow assisted dying in the UK".

The book Me Before You and the film adaptation of the same name discuss the organization as it serves a vital function in both the main plot and the characters' lives.

See also 
 Assisted suicide
 Betty and George Coumbias
 Derek Humphry
 Final Exit Network
 Jack Kevorkian
 Philip Nitschke
 Pegasos Swiss Association - An assisted death organization

References

External links 
 Exit home page
 Dignitas website 
 Dignitas: Swiss suicide helpers (BBC news article about Dignitas, Last Updated: Monday, January 20, 2003, 14:38 GMT)
 Death of Sir Edward Thomas Downes, CBE at Dignitas (BBC News Item – July 2009)
 Jacob Appel. "Next: Assisted Suicide for Healthy People". Huffington Post. July 16, 2009.
 Guide to Dignitas by Voluntary Euthanasia Society of New South Wales
 Lydvig Minelli

Assisted suicide
Death in Switzerland
Non-profit organisations based in Switzerland
Organizations established in 1998
1998 establishments in Switzerland
Euthanasia organizations